Dave Jackson (born c. 1964) is a Canadian former ice hockey referee.

Early life 
Jackson was born in Montreal and raised in Pointe-Claire.

Career 
Jackson, who officiated the 1988 Memorial Cup, was signed by the National Hockey League (NHL) to a minor-league contract in 1989. He made his NHL debut on December 22, 1990, officiating a match-up between the New Jersey Devils and Quebec Nordiques.

Jackson was chosen to officiate men's ice hockey at the 2014 Winter Olympics held in Sochi, Russia. Jackson retired after officiating his final NHL game on March 29, 2018. He now works for ESPN as their lead rules analyst.

References

External links
NHL Officials profile

1960s births
Living people
National Hockey League officials
Anglophone Quebec people

People from Pointe-Claire
Ice hockey people from Quebec
ESPN people